Eduard Henri "Eddy" Schuyer (born 28 July 1940) is a retired Dutch politician of the Democrats 66 (D66) party.

References

External links
Official

  E.H. (Eddy) Schuyer Parlement & Politiek
  E.H. Schuyer (D66) Eerste Kamer der Staten-Generaal

 

1940 births
Living people
Members of the Senate (Netherlands)
Members of the Provincial Council of South Holland
Municipal councillors of Wassenaar
Democrats 66 politicians
Dutch nonprofit executives
Dutch nonprofit directors
Dutch sports executives and administrators
Dutch educators
20th-century Dutch historians
Dutch chess players
Dutch chess writers
Dutch education writers
Dutch political writers
Dutch Jews
Jewish Dutch politicians
Jewish Dutch writers
Jewish educators
Jewish chess players
Jewish historians
Cultural historians
Officers of the Order of Orange-Nassau
Politicians from The Hague
People from Wassenaar